Good and Evil is a 1921 Austrian film directed by Michael Curtiz.

Cast
 Lucy Doraine
 Anton Tiller
 Alfons Fryland
 Magda Nagy
 Ralph Ostermann

See also
 Michael Curtiz filmography

External links

Films directed by Michael Curtiz
1921 films
Austrian black-and-white films
Austrian silent feature films